Lipie Śląskie  is a village in the administrative district of Gmina Pawonków, within Lubliniec County, Silesian Voivodeship, in southern Poland.

 

Abundant skeletons of the Upper Triassic tetrapods (i.e., large dicynodonts, dinosaurs) were described from the clay pit located between Lisowice and Lipie Śląskie.

References
 J. Dzik, G. Niedźwiedzki, T. Sulej, 2008: Zaskakujące uwieńczenie ery gadów ssakokształtnych. Ewolucja, 3: 2-21.
 Kowal-Linka, M., Krzemińska E., Czupyt, Z., 2019. The youngest detrital zircons from the Upper Triassic Lipie Śląskie (Lisowice) continental deposits (Poland): Implications for the maximum depositional age of the Lisowice bone-bearing horizon. Palaeogeography, Palaeoclimatology, Palaeoecology 514, 487–501.
 Kowal-Linka, M., Krzemińska, E., Czupyt, Z., 2018. Najmłodsze detrytyczne cyrkony z utworów triasu z Lipia Śląskiego (Lisowic) koło Lublińca a wiek lisowickiego poziomu kościonośnego. [W:] Kędzierski, M., Gradziński, M. (red.), Polska Konferencja Sedymentologiczna POKOS 7, Góra Św. Anny, 4–7 czerwca 2018 r., Materiały konferencyjne. Polskie Towarzystwo Geologiczne, Kraków, s. 77. 

Villages in Lubliniec County